Gallagher Mansion and Outbuilding is a historic home located at Baltimore, Maryland, United States. It was originally built about 1854 as an Italianate villa, and was subsequently enlarged and embellished in the Second Empire style of the later mid century. It features walls built of local rough fieldstone and rubble and a mansard roof covered with decorative slate.  The outbuilding is a two-story rectangular wood carriage house with a hip roof and cupola.

Gallagher Mansion and Outbuilding was listed on the National Register of Historic Places in 1983.

References

External links
, including photo from 1996, at Maryland Historical Trust

Houses on the National Register of Historic Places in Baltimore
Houses in Baltimore
Houses completed in 1854
Italianate architecture in Maryland
Northern Baltimore
Baltimore City Landmarks